Torbjørnsbu Station is a former railway station at Torbjørnsbu in Arendal, Norway. Located on the Arendal Line, it was operated by the Norwegian State Railways. The station was opened on 1 May 1911 and originally consisted of a station building and a loading spur. The station remained staffed until 1939 and was later closed.

Facilities and service
It was located at the western mouth of Barbu Tunnel.

History
Plans for a station in the area started for a spur to be built near the western mouth of the Barbu Tunnel, at Myrene, to store rolling stock. The plans were then expanded to include a station, which opened on 1 May 1911. A station building, designed by Harald Kaas and which is identical to the one at Rossedalen Station, was built. Additional spurs and a longer platform were built in 1917 and 1918. However, there has never been a passing loop at the station. It became unstaffed in 1939 and later closed.

References
Bibliography
 

Notes

Railway stations in Arendal
Railway stations on the Arendal Line
Disused railway stations in Norway
Railway stations opened in 1911
1911 establishments in Norway

Year of disestablishment missing